The Caudron Type K was a French floatplane with a very powerful, twenty cylinder radial engine in pusher configuration. It took part in a French seaplane competition in 1913, but was lost in a take-off accident during the competition.

Design

Before the Type K Caudron had built two pusher floatplanes, the single seat Caudron-Fabre amphibian and a two-seat version of it for Claude Graham-White. The two seat Type K was a significantly larger aircraft with three bay wings, rather than two, and a much more powerful Anzani engine than before. Nonetheless it had shared many of the characteristics of early Caudron designs, with unequal span, two spar wings and open frame fuselages bearing twin fins and rudders.

The Type K had rectangular plan wings with slightly angled tips. The upper wing span was 45% greater than that of the lower; on each side the upper and lower wings were joined by three sets of vertical, parallel interplane struts and another parallel pair leaning outwards and upwards to brace the outer parts of the upper wing. A , twenty cylinder, four-row air-cooled Anzani 20 radial engine was mounted in pusher configuration centrally between the wings, driving a propeller between the twin tailbooms. A cylindrical petrol tank was mounted laterally ahead of the engine and over the wing leading edge, at the back of a short fuselage pod in which the crew of two sat side-by-side in an open cockpit. This was a flat sided structure, with its upper surface curving sharply downwards.

The rear part of the Type K's fuselage was an open structure with two girders, each vertically cross braced and converging in profile, parallel to each other in plan and cross-linked horizontally at the tail.  This was fairly standard on the Caudron's of the period but was elaborated on the Type K by another long pair of members from the lower wing upwards; these secured the posts of a tall, narrow pair of constant chord rudders with quadrantal tips.  The tailplane, approximately rectangular in plan but cut away for rudder movement, was placed on the upper tail girders.

The Type K was a pure floatplane, with no permanent land wheels.

Operational history
In 1913 the French Aero Club organised a seaplane contest. This was held between 24 and 31 August in Deauville and attracted aircraft from ten different French manufacturers. Some sent more than one model, for example, the Caudron Types J and K. René Caudron piloted the latter and his engineer was the designer of its very new engine, Alessandro Anzani. Though not an amphibian, the Type K, classified as an avion de bord,  could take-off from a wooden runway using a pair of discardable bogies and it won a prize of 6,000 Francs by getting aloft after a  run. Whilst taking off on the 26 August, a float attachment failed when the Type K hit a large wave, causing the aircraft to capsize. Gaston Caudron, flying the Type J, successfully put down on the water to rescue the crew.

Specifications

References

Floatplanes
1910s French aircraft
TK
Biplanes
Aircraft first flown in 1913
Single-engined pusher aircraft